Terenti Kvirkvelia, well known with his pen-name Terenti Graneli (1897–1934) was a noted Georgian poet. Born in Tsalenjikha, he was raised in a family of poor peasants. After graduating primary school in his native village in 1918 he continued studying at the short courses organized by Shalva Nutsubidze in Tbilisi.
He had several jobs including a worker at the railway station, and clerk at the newspaper. Graneli published his first verses in 1918. His collection of poems "Memento mori" appeared in 1924. From the beginning of 1928 Graneli's health worsened and he died in 1934.

His works include poems, essays. His letters to his sisters are also well-known.

See also
Titsian Tabidze 
Galaktion Tabidze

References

Male poets from Georgia (country)
1897 births
1934 deaths
Burials at Didube Pantheon
20th-century poets from Georgia (country)
20th-century male writers